NeuroReport is a peer-reviewed scientific journal covering the field of neuroscience. It was established in 1990 and is published by Lippincott Williams & Wilkins. The editors-in-chief are Michael Jakowec and Patric Stanton. According to the Journal Citation Reports, the journal has a 2016 impact factor of 1.343.

References

External links

Neuroscience journals
Publications established in 1990
Lippincott Williams & Wilkins academic journals
English-language journals